The Abu Hajar Airport is an airfield near the town of Rmelan in the al-Hasakah Governorate of northeast Syria. Before 2010, it was used as an agricultural transport airport and was subsequently abandoned until the end of 2015.

History
In November and December 2015, the United States Air Force reportedly began reconstruction work of the airstrip with the support of the People's Protection Units in the area, landing two helicopters in the field.

The airport is planned to be used by the Combined Joint Task Force – Operation Inherent Resolve to provide air support for the Syrian Democratic Forces. The US had already airlifted  of supplies to the SDF as of 12 October 2015, two days after its establishment.

In January 2016, the SDF confirmed the handover of control of the air base from the YPG to the USAF. The US subsequently denied the reports that the USAF has taken control of the airport.

In February, the SDF announced that the airbase will only be used as a military logistics transportation base using Lockheed C-130 Hercules and helicopters, with the possibility of being a combat base in the future.

In late September, the Local Coordination Committees of Syria reported that a US helicopter transported opposition politician Ahmad Jarba and actor Jamal Suliman from Iraqi Kurdistan to the airport.

References

American involvement in the Syrian civil war
Airports in Syria
Al-Hasakah Governorate